Cupriavidus pinatubonensis is a Gram-negative, aerobic non-spore-forming, motile bacterium of the genus Cupriavidus and family Burkholderiaceae, isolated with Cupriavidus laharis together from volcanic mudflow deposits on Mount Pinatubo in the Philippines.

References

External links
Type strain of Cupriavidus pinatubonensis at BacDive -  the Bacterial Diversity Metadatabase

Burkholderiaceae
Bacteria described in 2006